The first USS Emerald was steam yacht that served in a non-commissioned status as a ferry boat at the Portsmouth Navy Yard at Kittery, Maine, from 1864 to 1883.

References

 

Auxiliary ships of the United States Navy
American Civil War auxiliary ships of the United States
Ships of the Union Navy
Individual yachts
Steam yachts
Steam ferries